Čreta pri Kokarjah is a dispersed settlement in the hills south of Nazarje in Slovenia. The area belongs to the traditional region of Styria and is now included in the Savinja Statistical Region.

Name
The name of the settlement was changed from Čreta to Čreta pri Kokarju in 1955. It was changed again in 1990 to Čreta pri Kokarjah.

References

External links
Čreta pri Kokarjah on Geopedia

Populated places in the Municipality of Nazarje